Masala Dosa, also called Masale dosey ( ಮಸಾಲೆ ದೋಸೆ ), is a South Indian dish. It is a type of dosa and has its origin in the town of Udupi in Karnataka. It is made from rice, lentils, Urad dal, Chana dal, fenugreek, puffed rice, Toor dal, dry red chilli and served with potato curry, chutneys, and sambar. It is popular in South India, but can be found in all other parts of the country and overseas. In South India, the preparation of masala dosa varies from city to city. There are variations in Masala dosa like Davanagere butter dosa and paper masala dosa.

Preparation
The dosa is made by soaking rice and lentils overnight in water and then grinding it into a batter. The batter is fermented overnight. It is pan-roasted until crispy and served with potato curry, chutneys or sambar.

Variations

References
 

South Indian cuisine
Fermented foods
Indian breads
Indian fast food
Telangana cuisine
Andhra cuisine
Mangalorean cuisine
Malaysian cuisine
Pancakes
Singaporean cuisine
Tamil cuisine
Kerala cuisine
Staple foods
Vegetarian dishes of India
Dosa